Atılım University (In Turkish: Atılım Üniversitesi) is a highly respected private university, created in 1997. It is located in Ankara, the capital of Turkey. The language of instruction for most courses is English. Education programs are at international standards (e.g. ABET 2000). Atılım University is considered to be one of the best schools in Turkey and was chosen as one of the best 401-500 universities in the World in 2016 by London-based The Higher Education (THE) and has been highly ranked by many other institutions.

Profile & History

Atilim University was founded on 15 July 1997 by Atılım Foundatıon, which was created in 1996. It was founded to serve as a Foundation University in the capacity of a legal entity pursuant to provisions of Law no. 2547 concerning the Foundation of Higher Education Institutes. 
Atılım University is located on 250 acres of land in İncek, Gölbaşı, one of the most recent and fastest developing residential areas of Ankara, 20 km from the City Centre and 7 km from the motorway. The campus contains faculty buildings, laboratories, conference halls, basketball and volleyball fields, a gymnasium, tennis courts, a condition hall, a swimming pool, cafeterias, cafes, and recreation areas where outdoor activities are also carried out. 
Atılım University has also supported developing various student's clubs and societies from its beginning, that's why up to this date over 60% of students are involved in 54 of them. The clubs and societies have been provided with the opportunity to organize technical and social trips, panels, conferences, debates, cultural and social activities so as to share the social atmosphere and learn.

Atılım University also has a high number of sister universities such as the University of the Incarnate Word in San Antonio, Texas, and 31 European universities in Germany, Belgium, United Kingdom, Czech Republic, Denmark, Estonia, Finland, France, Greece, Hungary, Italy, Ireland, Lithuania, Poland, Romania, Slovakia, Slovenia, Spain and the Netherlands. These universities are collaborating with Atılım University under the scope of Erasmus Programme. Atılım is also among the Erasmus University Charter universities.

Academic Units

Faculties
 Faculty of Engineering
Department of Aerospace Engineering
Department of Automotive Engineering
Department of Civil Engineering
Department of Chemical Engineering and Applied Chemistry
Department of Computer Engineering
Department of Electrical & Electronics Engineering
Department of Energy Systems Engineering
Department of Industrial Engineering
Department of Information Systems Engineering
Department of Information Systems Engineering UOLP
Department of Mechatronics Engineering
Department of Manufacturing Engineering
Department of Materials Engineering
Department of Mechanical Engineering
Department of Software Engineering
Faculty of Management
Department of Economics
Department of Economics in Turkish Medium
Department of International Relations
Department of International Logistics And Transportation
Department of Management
Department of Management in Turkish Medium
Department of Public Relations and Advertising
Department of Political Science and Public Administration in Turkish Medium
Department of Tourism Management
Faculty of Art, Design and Architecture
Department of Graphic Design
Department of Interior Architecture and Environmental Design
Department of Fashion & Textile Design
Department of Industrial Product Design
Department of Architecture
Faculty of Arts & Sciences
Department of Mathematics
Department of English Language and Literature
Department of Translation and Interpretation
Department of Psychology
Faculty of Law
Faculty of Medicine

Institutes

Graduate School of Natural & Applied Sciences
Graduate School of Social Sciences

Service Courses Units
Departmental English Language Studies Unit (DELSU)
Physics Group
Chemistry Group

English Preparatory School
Preparatory School

Research and Application Centers

AWAC - Academic Writing & Advisory Center
EDM – Electric Discharge Machining
Science Entertainment Center
ETPO – Educational Technologies and Pedagogy Office
KASAUM - Woman Issues Study Center
MFCE - Metal Forming Centre of Excellence
RoTAM – Robot Technologies Application and Research Center
Continuous Education Application and Research Center
TÜTAM – Turkey's History Study and Research Center
UTAM – Space Technologies Application and Research Center
SaVTAM – Defense Technologies Application and Research Center
Logistic Simulation and Application Center
Performance Management Application and Research Centre
Railway Materials Application and Research Center

Research laboratories

EERL – European Remote Radio Laboratory
Biophysics Laboratory
Biochemistry Research Laboratory
SEAL – Politic and Economic Researches Laboratory
@NANO – Nanoscopy Laboratory
SAEL – Social Sciences Research and Training Laboratory
ATOMSEL – Optoelectronic Materials and Solar Energy Laboratory
AYAL – Structural Acoustic Laboratory
Polymer Composite Biocompatibility Research Laboratory
FlyRoVeL – Flying Robotics and Robotic Vehicles Laboratory
source:

The library

The library started operating in March 1998 in a classroom of Atılım's first building, with 100 books and one PC. Later that year it moved to the operation building, where it stayed until academic year of 2000/2001, when it moved to a new building, designated only to library's purposes. Over the years the number of publications grew together with increasing number of students, as well as academic and administrative staff, and has in the year of 2011 exceeded 100,000. The library collection is currently made of printed books, E-books, printed magazines, E-journals, multimedia, databases and theses. The collection has among them also many valuable books and encyclopedias, such as instance the “İNÖNÜ ENCYCLOPEDIA” (1946), which is the copy signed by the Prime Minister İsmet İnönü, and which contains the preface written by the Ministry of National Education Hasan Ali Yücel. 
Another valuable source in the Library Collection is the book entitled “GAZİ’NİN ESERİ: L’oeuvre du GAZİ / Jean Weinberg, 1933”. The book prepared in Turkish and French, has been printed 2 copies and the copies have been submitted by Jean Weinberg to the related institution for the correction of the mistakes. One of 2 copies of this book has been included in the library and it has been donated by Retired Major General Sıtkı Aydınel.
Precisely because of the library's fast growth, the requirement of new library construction has arisen, to which it moved in 2013. At the end of that academic year the library collection contained 75.305 printed books, 92.625 E-books, 3.340 printed magazines and 29.325 E-publications, with which the whole collection reached total number of 203,137 publications together. 
The wide collection and the construction itself are one of the biggest among the libraries in Ankara to this date.

References

External links 
Atilim University website
Library
Campus Map

Educational institutions established in 1996
Universities and colleges in Ankara
Private universities and colleges in Turkey
Universities and colleges in Turkey
1996 establishments in Turkey